12 Views of Beatenberg is the third album by South African indie pop band Beatenberg. It was released on 14 December 2018 by Island Records. The album includes singles "Camera" and "Ode To The Berg Wind," as well as "Aphrodite" a collaboration with African pop artist TRESOR. Upon release the album jumped to number four on the South African iTunes chart.

Track listing

Personnel
Matthew Field - production, vocals (1-7, 9-15), guitar, piano (1-2, 4-11, 13-15), keyboards (3, 12), bass guitar (1, 3), engineering (3)
Ross Dorkin - production, bass guitar (2, 4-15), guitar (2), engineering (2, 12)
Robin Brink - production, drums and percussion (1-2, 4-15), engineering (2, 12)
Matt Colton - mastering
Rhys Downing - engineering (1, 4-7, 9, 11, 13)
Ash Workman - mixing (1-7, 9, 11-15)
Jürgen von Wechmar - additional vocal engineering (1, 4, 6), additional vocals (14)
TRESOR - featured vocals (3)
Sally Minter - flute (7)
Carin Bam - oboe (7)
Charl van der Merwe - bassoon (7)

References

2018 albums
Beatenberg (band) albums